Sir Arnold Hughes "Hugh" Ennor  (10 October 1912 – 14 October 1977) was a senior Australian public servant and policymaker.

Life and career
Ennor was born in Melbourne, the son of a joiner. For schooling, he attended a local Roman Catholic school, O'Neill College in Elsternwick, Victoria and later Melbourne Technical College. He graduated from the University of Melbourne as a Bachelor of Science with first class honours in 1938, achieving a Master of Science in 1939 and a Doctor of Science in 1944 at the same university.

During the Second World War, Ennor was engaged by Australian Chemical Warfare Research in top secret trials in northern Queensland of mustard gas protective clothing and other counter-measures. He and fellow-biochemist J. W. Legge designed and oversaw the construction of a 100 cubic metre (3,500 cu ft) stainless-steel temperature-controlled gas chamber as part of these experiments. See also Keen as Mustard

Ennor was the first professor appointed by the new Australian National University in Canberra in 1948.

In February 1967, Ennor was appointed Secretary of the Australian Government Department of Education and Science. He served as secretary of the science department for over ten years, in the Department of Science (I), the Department of Science and Consumer Affairs, and the Department of Science (II)

He also served for a short period as Acting Secretary of the Department of Education when the Whitlam Government split the Department of Education and Science into two.

Hugh Ennor died on Friday 14 October 1977 in Canberra, aged 65. His death was just a week after his retirement from the Australian Public Service.

Awards
Ennor was made a Commander of the Order of the British Empire in January 1963 as a Professor of Biochemistry at the Australian National University. In June 1965 he was made a Knight Bachelor.

Notes

References

1912 births
1977 deaths
Australian Commanders of the Order of the British Empire
Australian Knights Bachelor
Australian public servants
Deaths from cancer in the Australian Capital Territory
University of Melbourne alumni
Secretaries of the Australian Government Education Department
Fellows of the Australian Academy of Science
20th-century Australian public servants
People from the City of Glen Eira
Public servants from Melbourne
Academic staff of the Australian National University